The 2010–11 Primeira Liga (also known as Liga ZON Sagres for sponsorship reasons) was the 77th season of the Primeira Liga, the top professional league for Portuguese association football clubs. It began on 15 August 2010 and ended on 14 May 2011. A total of 16 teams contested the league, 14 of which already took part in the previous season and two of which were promoted from the Liga de Honra. Benfica were the defending champions but finished runners-up to Porto, who won their 25th league title in the club's first-ever unbeaten season. Porto's forward Hulk was the top scorer with 23 goals.

Teams
Belenenses and Leixões were relegated at the end of the 2009–10 season after finishing in the bottom two places of the table. Belenenses ended an 11-year spell at the highest level of Portuguese football, while Leixões returned to the Liga de Honra after three years.

The two relegated teams were replaced by Liga de Honra champions Beira-Mar and runners-up Portimonense. Beira-Mar returned to the top-level league after three years of absence, and Portimonense made their first appearance in their league since being relegated at the end of the 1989–90 season.

Team summaries

Personnel and sponsoring

Managerial changes

League table

Positions by round

Results

Season statistics

Top goalscorers

Updated as of games played on 14 May 2011.Source: LPFP

Awards

Monthly awards

SJPF Player of the Month

SJPF Young Player of the Month

SJPF Fair Play Award

List of 2010–11 transfers

References

External links
  
 Official regulation 
 Official calendar 
 Official statistics 

Primeira Liga seasons
Port
1